This is a list of television and radio sitcoms (situation comedies).

0–9

A

B

C

D

E

F

G

H

I

J

K

L

M

N

O

P

Q

R

S

T

U

V

W

Y

Z

See also 
 List of situation comedies with LGBT characters

Sitcoms